Svenska Supercupen, Swedish Super Cup, was a one-off fixture in Swedish football played between the Allsvenskan champions and the winners of Svenska Cupen. The fixture was played in November, after the Allsvenskan season. 

In the event of a club winning the double (as AIK did in 2009 and Helsingborg in 2011) the runner up of the Allsvenskan would take part. In 2011, Helsingborgs IF became the first team to have won Svenska Supercupen and not being the defending Allsvenskan champions. The winner of Svenska Supercupen received a prize money of 250,000 SEK. 

The 2015 match, which became the last edition, was played on 8 November at Nya Parken, Norrköping where league winners IFK Norrköping competed against cup winners IFK Göteborg. IFK Norrköping won the match 3–0.

History 
Founded in 2007, the first six editions was played in March, before the start of the season. However, because Svenska Cupen changed into an autumn-spring format in 2012, Svenska Supercupen was moved to November to avoid collision with the Svenska Cupen group stage in March. Because of this, the 2012 Allsvenskan champions, IF Elfsborg never got the chance to compete even though the Swedish Football Association had plans of letting IF Elfsborg face the 2012 Allsvenskan runners-up BK Häcken in the spring of 2013.

The combination of cold weather and high ticket prices has had a negative effect on attendance. Even though the match is played at the home stadium of the Allsvenskan champion, attendance has hovered around 2,000 although 10,362 attended the 2011 edition which was more than the cumulative attendance until that year. It remains to be seen if this was a result of the fixture being a Skåne derby or an increase in interest in the fixture. Svenska Cupen has experienced similar problems with attendance.

List of winners

Performances

Performance by club

Total cup wins by city

Total cup wins by county

See also
 Allsvenskan
 Svenska Cupen
 Svenska Supercupen (women)

References

External links 
 

2
Svenska Supercupen
Defunct football competitions in Sweden